In enzymology, a homoserine kinase is an enzyme that catalyzes the chemical reaction

ATP + L-homoserine  ADP + O-phospho-L-homoserine

Thus, the two substrates of this enzyme are ATP and L-homoserine, whereas its two products are ADP and O-phospho-L-homoserine.

This enzyme belongs to the family of transferases, specifically those transferring phosphorus-containing groups (phosphotransferases) with an alcohol group as acceptor.  The systematic name of this enzyme class is ATP:L-homoserine O-phosphotransferase. Other names in common use include homoserine kinase (phosphorylating), and HSK.  This enzyme participates in glycine, serine and threonine metabolism.

Structural studies

References

 
 

EC 2.7.1
Enzymes of known structure